Club Deportivo Santaní, is a Paraguayan football club based in the city of San Estanislao.  The club was founded February 27, 2009 and plays Paraguayan Primera División.

History
In the 2014 Division Intermedia season, Deportivo Santaní finishes in 2nd position but is tied first with Sportivo San Lorenzo, who are in 1st position, both teams having 57 points. They face each other in a play-off on 1 November 2014 at the Estadio Defensores del Chaco, with the winner gaining the promotion into the first division Paraguayan Primera División in 2015.

Current squad
As of March 2021.

Notable players
To appear in this section a player must have either:
 Played at least 125 games for the club.
 Set a club record or won an individual award while at the club.
 Been part of a national team at any time.
 Played in the first division of any other football association (outside of Paraguay).
 Played in a continental and/or intercontinental competition.

2000's

2010's
 Rodrigo Teixeira (2015)
 Víctor Aquino (2015–2016)
 Leandro Gracian (2015–2016)
Non-CONMEBOL players
 Hiroki Uchida (2015)
 Alonso Collazo (2015)

References

External links
 Ceroacero Profile
 ESPNDeportes: Deportivo Santaní Info

 
Deportivo Santani
2009 establishments in Paraguay